The 2009–10 Ligue Magnus season was the 89th regular season of the ice hockey elite league in France and the sixth season of the Ligue Magnus.

Regular season

Playoffs

Relegation
 Bisons de Neuilly-sur-Marne - Avalanche Mont-Blanc 2:3 (3:2 SO, 3:1, 2:4, 2:3 SO, 2:6)

Trophies
Best scorer (Charles Ramsey Trophy) : Jonathan Bellemare (Angers)
Best French player (Albert Hassler Trophy): Damien Fleury (Grenoble)
Best goaltender (Jean Ferrand Trophy) : Ramón Sopko (Briançon)
Best rookie (Jean-Pierre Graff Trophy): Ronan Quemener (Gap)
Best coach : Luciano Basile (Briançon).
Best referee : Jimmy Bergamelli.
Fair play team (Marcel Claret Trophy) : Briançon.

References 

Regular season results 

2009-10
1
Fra